The steam locomotives of Baden Class IV c were passenger locomotives operated by Grand Duchy of Baden State Railway in the former south German state of Baden.

History 

As part of the purchase of  locomotives in the early 1870s, a total of eight batches of Class IV c engines were ordered. These locomotives were used above all on lines with steep inclines in the Black Forest and the Odenwald. As a result, several engines were equipped with a Riggenbach counter-pressure brake.

Design features 

Then dimensions of these engines were largely the same as those of the Class IV b. However the double frame was dropped and replaced by a simple plate frame. The engine had a very short wheelbase and as a result good curve-running performance. In addition the carrying axle had a side play of 10 mm. It was returned to its centre position by sloping bearing surfaces (geneigte Doppelflächen). The grate area of the firebox turned out to be very small; as a result its steam generation was not particularly satisfactory. Trials with ribbed tubes did not produce any improvements. The large steam dome sat on the rear boiler section.

The outside wet-steam engine had inside valves and drove the first coupled axle. The wheels were sprung with leaf springs located over the top, that were linked by a compensating lever between the coupled wheels.

The vehicles were equipped with tenders of classes 2 T 8 or 2 T 6.67. Several locomotives were equipped with rearward-facing driver's cabs on tenders. This enabled them to work routes without a turntable.

Sources
 Hermann Lohr, Georg Thielmann: Lokomotiv-Archiv Baden. transpress, Berlin 1988,

See also
Grand Duchy of Baden State Railway
List of Baden locomotives and railbuses

2-4-0 locomotives
04 c
Standard gauge locomotives of Germany
Railway locomotives introduced in 1875
1B n2 locomotives
Maschinenbau-Gesellschaft Karlsruhe locomotives
Passenger locomotives